The longfin worm eel (Myrophis anterodorsalis) is an eel in the family Ophichthidae (worm/snake eels). It was described by John E. McCosker, Eugenia Brandt Böhlke and James Erwin Böhlke in 1989. It is a marine, tropical eel which is known from Colombia, in the western central Atlantic Ocean. It is known to dwell within one meter of the surface.

References

Fish described in 1989
Myrophis